Tephrosia is a genus of flowering plants in the pea family, Fabaceae. It is widespread in both the Eastern and Western Hemisphere, where it is found in tropical and warm-temperate regions.

The generic name is derived from the Greek word τεφρος (tephros), meaning "ash-colored," referring to the greyish tint given to the leaves by their dense trichomes. Hoarypea is a common name for plants in this genus, along with goat's rue and devil's shoestring.

Uses
Many species in the genus are poisonous, particularly to fish, for their high concentration of rotenone. The black seeds of Tephrosia species have historically been used by indigenous cultures as fish toxins. In the last century, several Tephrosia species have been studied in connection with the use of rotenone as an insecticide and pesticide.

Tephrosia vogelii is also one of the many beneficial nitrogen-fixing legumes that can be used in a permaculture forest gardening system as a source of living 'chop and drop' mulch.

Species
Species include:

Tephrosia abbottiae C.E.Wood
Tephrosia acaciifolia Baker
Tephrosia adunca Benth.
Tephrosia aequilata Baker
Tephrosia alba Du Puy & Labat
Tephrosia albissima H.M.L.Forbes
Tephrosia ambigua D.Dietr.
Tephrosia amoena E.Mey.
Tephrosia andongensis Baker
Tephrosia angustissima Chapman
Tephrosia anomala Thulin
Tephrosia apollinea (Delile) DC.
Tephrosia arenicola Maconochie
Tephrosia argyrolampra Harms
Tephrosia argyrotricha Harms
Tephrosia arnhemica C.T.White
Tephrosia astragaloides Benth.
Tephrosia athiensis Baker f.
Tephrosia aurantiaca Harms
Tephrosia bachmannii Harms
Tephrosia barba-jovis Cufod.
Tephrosia barbatala Bosman & de Haas
Tephrosia barberi J.R.Drumm.
Tephrosia belizensis Lundell
Tephrosia benthamii Pedley
Tephrosia berhautiana Lescot
Tephrosia betsileensis (R.Vig.) Du Puy & Labat
Tephrosia bibracteolata (Dumaz-le-Grand) Du Puy & Labat
Tephrosia bidwillii Benth.
Tephrosia boiviniana Baill.
Tephrosia brachycarpa Benth.
Tephrosia brachyodon Domin
Tephrosia bracteolata Guill. & Perr.
Tephrosia brummittii Schrire
Tephrosia burchellii Burtt Davy
Tephrosia caerulea Baker f.
Tephrosia calophylla Bedd.
Tephrosia cana Brandegee
Tephrosia canarensis J.R.Drumm.
Tephrosia candida (Roxb.) DC.
Tephrosia capensis (Jacq.) Pers.
Tephrosia capitata Verdc.
Tephrosia carrollii O. Téllez
Tephrosia cephalantha Baker
Tephrosia cephalophora Harms
Tephrosia chimanimaniana Brummitt
Tephrosia chisumpae Brummitt
Tephrosia chrysophylla Pursh
Tephrosia cinerea (L.) Pers.
Tephrosia clementii Skan
Tephrosia clementis Alain
Tephrosia coccinea Wall.
Tephrosia collina V.S.Sharma
Tephrosia conspicua W.Fitzg.
Tephrosia conzattii (Rydb.) Standl.
Tephrosia corallicola (Small) Leon
Tephrosia cordata Hutch. & Burtt Davy
Tephrosia cordatistipula J.B.Gillett
Tephrosia coriacea Benth.
Tephrosia coronilloides Baker
Tephrosia crassifolia Benth.
Tephrosia crocea Benth.
Tephrosia cuernavacana (Rose) J.F.Macbr.
Tephrosia curtissii (Small) Shinners
Tephrosia curvata De Wild.
Tephrosia dasyphylla Baker
Tephrosia debilis Domin
Tephrosia decaryana (Dumaz-le-Grand) Du Puy & Labat
Tephrosia decora Baker
Tephrosia decumbens Benth.
Tephrosia deflexa Baker
Tephrosia delestangii Pedley
Tephrosia densiflora Hook.f.
Tephrosia desertorum Scheele
Tephrosia dichroocarpa A.Rich.
Tephrosia dietrichiae Domin
Tephrosia disperma Baker
Tephrosia diversifolia (Rose) J.F.Macbr.
Tephrosia djalonica Hutch. & Dalziel
Tephrosia dregeana E.Mey.
Tephrosia drepanocarpa Baker
Tephrosia dura Baker
Tephrosia egregia Sandwith
Tephrosia elata Deflers
Tephrosia elegans Schum.
Tephrosia elliottii (Nutt.) Benth.
Tephrosia elliptica Bosman & de Haas
Tephrosia elongata E.Mey.
Tephrosia emeroides A.Rich.
Tephrosia eriocarpa Benth.
Tephrosia euchroa Verd.
Tephrosia euprepes Brummitt
Tephrosia falcata (Thunb.) Pers.
Tephrosia falciformis S.V.Ramaswamy
Tephrosia faulknerae Brummitt
Tephrosia feddemana McVaugh
Tephrosia festina Brummitt
Tephrosia filiflora Chiov.
Tephrosia filipes Benth.
Tephrosia flagellaris Domin
Tephrosia flammea Benth.
Tephrosia flexuosa G.Don
Tephrosia florida (F.Dietr.) C.E.Wood
Tephrosia floridana (Vail) Isely
Tephrosia foliolosa (Rydb.) L.Riley
Tephrosia forbesii Baker
Tephrosia forrestiana F.Muell.
Tephrosia fulvinervis A.Rich.
Tephrosia gaudium-solis Domin
Tephrosia geminiflora Baker
Tephrosia genistoides (Dumaz-le-Grand) Du Puy & Labat
Tephrosia glomeruliflora Meissner
Tephrosia gobensis Brummitt
Tephrosia gorgonea Cout.
Tephrosia gossweileri Baker f.
Tephrosia gracilenta H.M.L.Forbes
Tephrosia gracilipes Guill. & Perr.
Tephrosia grandibracteata Merxm.
Tephrosia grandiflora (Aiton) Pers.
Tephrosia griseola H.M.L.Forbes
Tephrosia guayameoensis O.Tellez
Tephrosia haussknechtii Bornm.
Tephrosia heckmanniana Harms
Tephrosia heterophylla Vatke
Tephrosia hildebrandtii Vatke
Tephrosia hispidula (Michx.) Pers.
Tephrosia hochstetteri Chiov.
Tephrosia hockii De Wild.
Tephrosia holstii Taub.
Tephrosia hookeriana Wight & Arn.
Tephrosia huillensis Baker
Tephrosia humbertii Dumaz-le-Grand
Tephrosia humilis Guill. & Perr.
Tephrosia hypoleuca L.Riley
Tephrosia ibityensis (R.Vig.) Du Puy & Labat
Tephrosia inandensis H.M.L.Forbes
Tephrosia incana (Roxb.) Graham ex Wight
Tephrosia interrupta Engl.
Tephrosia iringae Baker f.
Tephrosia isaloensis Du Puy & Labat
Tephrosia jamnagarensis Santapau
Tephrosia juncea Benth.
Tephrosia kalamboensis Brummitt & J.B.Gillett
Tephrosia karkarensis Thulin
Tephrosia kasikiensis Baker f.
Tephrosia kassasii Boulos
Tephrosia katangensis De Wild.
Tephrosia kazibensis Cronquist
Tephrosia kerrii J.R.Drumm. & Craib
Tephrosia kindu De Wild.
Tephrosia kraussiana Meissner
Tephrosia laevigata Baker
Tephrosia lamprolobioides F.Muell.
Tephrosia lanata M.Martens & Galeotti
Tephrosia langlassei Micheli
Tephrosia lathyroides Guill. & Perr.
Tephrosia laxa Domin
Tephrosia lebrunii Cronquist
Tephrosia leiocarpa A.Gray
Tephrosia lepida Baker f.
Tephrosia leptoclada Benth.
Tephrosia letestui Tisser.
Tephrosia leucantha Kunth
Tephrosia leveillei Domin
Tephrosia lindheimeri A.Gray
Tephrosia linearis (Willd.) Pers.
Tephrosia longipes Meissner
Tephrosia lortii Baker f.
Tephrosia lupinifolia DC.
Tephrosia lurida Sond.
Tephrosia luzoniensis Vogel
Tephrosia lyallii Baker
Tephrosia macrantha Pringle
Tephrosia macrocarpa Benth.
Tephrosia macropoda (E.Mey.) Harv.
Tephrosia macrostachya (Benth.) Domin
Tephrosia maculata Merr. & L.M.Perry
Tephrosia madrensis Seem.
Tephrosia major Micheli
Tephrosia malvina Brummitt
Tephrosia manikensis De Wild.
Tephrosia marginella H.M.L.Forbes
Tephrosia mariana DC.
Tephrosia maxima (L.) Pers.
Tephrosia melanocalyx Baker
Tephrosia mexicana C.E.Wood
Tephrosia meyerana J.B.Gillett
Tephrosia micrantha J.B.Gillett
Tephrosia microcarpa O. Téllez
Tephrosia miranda Brummitt
Tephrosia mohrii (Rydb.) R.K.Godfrey
Tephrosia monophylla Schinz
Tephrosia montana Brummitt
Tephrosia moroubensis Tisser.
Tephrosia mossiensis A.Chev.
Tephrosia mucronata (Thunb.) DC.
Tephrosia muenzneri Harms
Tephrosia multifolia Rose
Tephrosia multijuga R.G.N.Young
Tephrosia mysteriosa DeLaney
Tephrosia nana Schweinf.
Tephrosia natalensis H.M.L.Forbes
Tephrosia nervosa Chodat & Hassl.
Tephrosia newtoniana Torre
Tephrosia nicaraguensis Oerst.
Tephrosia nitens Seem.
Tephrosia noctiflora Baker
Tephrosia nseleensis De Wild.
Tephrosia nubica (Boiss.) Baker
Tephrosia nyikensis Baker
Tephrosia obbiadensis Chiov.
Tephrosia oblongata Benth.
Tephrosia obovata Merr.
Tephrosia odorata Balf.f.
Tephrosia oligophylla Benth.
Tephrosia onobrychoides Nutt.
Tephrosia oubanguiensis Tisser.
Tephrosia oxygona Baker
Tephrosia pachypoda L.Riley
Tephrosia pallens (Aiton) Pers.
Tephrosia palmeri S.Watson
Tephrosia paniculata Baker
Tephrosia parvifolia (R.Vig.) Du Puy & Labat
Tephrosia paucijuga Harms
Tephrosia pearsonii Baker f.
Tephrosia pedicellata Baker
Tephrosia pentaphylla (Roxb.) G.Don
Tephrosia perrieri R.Vig.
Tephrosia persica Boiss. (called نیلکی Nilaki in Persian)
Tephrosia phaeosperma Benth.
Tephrosia phylloxylon (R.Vig.) Du Puy & Labat
Tephrosia pietersii H.M.L.Forbes
Tephrosia pinifolia Du Puy & Labat
Tephrosia platycarpa Guill. & Perr.
Tephrosia platyphylla (Rose) Standl.
Tephrosia pogonocalyx C.E.Wood
Tephrosia polyphylla (Chiov.) J.B.Gillett
Tephrosia polystachya E.Mey.
Tephrosia polyzyga Benth.
Tephrosia pondoensis (Codd) Schrire
Tephrosia porrecta Benth.
Tephrosia potosina Brandegee
Tephrosia praecana Brummitt
Tephrosia pringlei (Rose) J.F.Macbr.
Tephrosia pseudolongipes Baker f.
Tephrosia pulchella Hook. f.
Tephrosia pumila (Lam.) Pers.
Tephrosia punctata J.B.Gillett
Tephrosia pungens (R.Vig.) Du Puy & Labat
Tephrosia purpurea (L.) Pers.
Tephrosia quercetorum C.E.Wood
Tephrosia radicans Baker
Tephrosia rechingeri Ali
Tephrosia remotiflora Benth.
Tephrosia reptans Baker
Tephrosia retamoides (Baker) Soler.
Tephrosia reticulata Benth.
Tephrosia retusa Burtt Davy
Tephrosia rhodantha Brandegee
Tephrosia rhodesica Baker f.
Tephrosia richardsiae J.B.Gillett
Tephrosia rigida Span.
Tephrosia rigidula Baker
Tephrosia ringoetii Baker f.
Tephrosia robinsoniana Brummitt
Tephrosia rosea Benth.
Tephrosia roxburghiana J.R.Drumm.
Tephrosia rufula Pedley
Tephrosia rugelii Shuttlew.
Tephrosia rupicola J.B.Gillett
Tephrosia savannicola Domin
Tephrosia saxicola C.E.Wood
Tephrosia scopulata Thulin
Tephrosia seemannii (Britten & Baker f.) K.Schum.
Tephrosia semiglabra Sond.
Tephrosia seminole Shinners
Tephrosia sengaensis Baker f.
Tephrosia senna Kunth
Tephrosia senticosa (L.) Pers.
Tephrosia sessiliflora (Poir.) Hassl.
Tephrosia seticulosa (L.) Pers.
Tephrosia shamimii Ali
Tephrosia shiluwanensis Schinz
Tephrosia siamensis J.R.Drumm.
Tephrosia simulans C.E.Wood
Tephrosia sinapou (Buc'hoz) A.Chev.
Tephrosia singuliflora F.Muell.
Tephrosia smythiae McVaugh
Tephrosia socotrana Thulin
Tephrosia sousae O. Téllez
Tephrosia spechtii Pedley
Tephrosia sphaerospora F.Muell.
Tephrosia spicata (Walter) Torr. & A.Gray
Tephrosia spinosa (L.f.) Pers.
Tephrosia stipularis (Desv.) DC.
Tephrosia stipuligera W.Fitzg.
Tephrosia stormsii De Wild.
Tephrosia stricta (L.f.) Pers.
Tephrosia strigosa (Dalzell) Santapau & Maheshw.
Tephrosia stuartii Benth.
Tephrosia subaphylla Du Puy & Labat
Tephrosia submontana (Rose) L.Riley
Tephrosia subnuda Domin
Tephrosia subpectinata Domin
Tephrosia subpraecox Cronquist
Tephrosia subtriflora Baker
Tephrosia subulata Hutch. & Burtt Davy
Tephrosia supina Domin
Tephrosia sylitroides Baker f.
Tephrosia sylviae Berhaut
Tephrosia tanganyikensis De Wild.
Tephrosia tepicana (Standl.) Standl.
Tephrosia thurberi Rydb.
Tephrosia tinctoria Pers.
Tephrosia totta (Thunb.) Pers.
Tephrosia travancorica Thoth. & D.N.Das
Tephrosia tundavalensis Bamps
Tephrosia uniflora Pers.
Tephrosia uniovulata F.Muell.
Tephrosia varians (Bailey) C.T.White
Tephrosia verdickii De Wild.
Tephrosia vernicosa C.E.Wood
Tephrosia vestita Vogel
Tephrosia vicioides Schltdl.
Tephrosia viguieri Du Puy & Labat
Tephrosia villosa (L.) Pers.
Tephrosia virens Pedley
Tephrosia virgata H.M.L.Forbes
Tephrosia virginiana (L.) Pers.
Tephrosia vogelii Hook.f.
Tephrosia vohimenaensis Du Puy & Labat
Tephrosia watsoniana (Standl.) J.F.Macbr.
Tephrosia whyteana Baker f.
Tephrosia wynaadensis J.R.Drumm.
Tephrosia zambiana Brummitt
Tephrosia zollingeri Backer
Tephrosia zoutpansbergensis Bremek.

Hybrids
Hybrids include:
Tephrosia × intermedia (Small) G.L. Nesom & Zarucchi

See also
 Helena M. L. Forbes

References

External links

 l
 Plantilustrations.org: Tephrosia. (Botanical illustrations for Tephrosia species.)

 
Fabaceae genera
Millettieae
Taxa named by Christiaan Hendrik Persoon
Taxonomy articles created by Polbot